Mildred Considine (1887–1933) was an American screenwriter and actress active during Hollywood's silent era.

Biography

Origins 
Mildred was born in Chicago to John Considine (a big-time vaudeville promoter and theater manager who attracted a fair amount of controversies in his day) and Julia Nussbaumer.

Her parents divorced when she was young after her mother found out that her father—who spent a good deal of time working in Seattle—had taken up with another woman. She spent most of her childhood with her mother and stepfather in Chicago, where she later attended the Academy of Fine Arts.

Theatrical career 
Given her family's vaudeville background, it was not surprising Mildred was writing and performing at venues in Chicago and around the country from a young age.

Hollywood ambitions 
Mildred been writing scenarios since she was 15, and had acted in a number of Essanay shorts as a teenager. By 1917, she had been hired by Constance Talmadge as a scenario editor. That same year, her first scripts, Panthea and Framing Framers, were produced and released. She later wrote for Anita Stewart and Mary Pickford, although her relationship with the latter star would turn sour in 1921 when Mildred alleged that Pickford had ripped off one of her scripts in Through the Back Door and not given proper credit. She would also sue Zelda Sears on similar grounds.

Death 
She died in Chicago, Illinois, in 1933, aged 46. Little is known about her death.

Relatives 
Her half brother, John Considine Jr., would end up being a film producer; his sons, Tim and John, forged successful careers for themselves as actors.

Selected filmography 
 Panthea (1917)
 Framing Framers (1917)
 The Ghosts of Yesterday (1918)
 A Romance of the Underworld (1918)
 All Wrong (1919)
 Under Suspicion (1919)
 Let's Be Fashionable (1920)
 The Girl of My Heart (1920)
 Hearts and Masks (1921)
 The Bride's Play (1922)
 The Dangerous Little Demon (1922)
 The Real Adventure (1922)
 Heroes of the Street (1922)

References 

American women screenwriters
1887 births
1933 deaths
Screenwriters from Illinois
20th-century American women writers
20th-century American screenwriters